David Graham Lutz (born December 30, 1959) is a former American football offensive lineman who played thirteen seasons in the National Football League (NFL), mainly for the Kansas City Chiefs.

He played and started in every game of his career except one. When his father Graham died in 1984, he went to his funeral. He is married and has two daughters.

References

1959 births
Living people
American football offensive guards
Kansas City Chiefs players
Detroit Lions players
Georgia Tech Yellow Jackets football players
People from Monroe, North Carolina
People from Polkton, North Carolina
Ed Block Courage Award recipients